Ronny André Hafsås (born November 14, 1985) is a retired Norwegian biathlete and cross-country skier.

Biathlon career
Hafsås first competed in the Biathlon World Cup in Pyeongchang, South Korea in February 2008. His initial appearance (in a 10 km sprint) was spoiled by bad shooting, but he earned the first World Cup points of his career in the pursuit that followed, with a 21st place. Hafsås claimed his first top ten placing in the World Cup the next week, placing ninth in another sprint in Khanty-Mansiysk.

Hafsås' best finish in the Biathlon World Cup so far is a sixth place, which he earned (again in a sprint) during the opening weekend of the 2008-09 season at Östersund.

Cross-country skiing career
As a cross-country skier, Hafsås has two World Cup victories (one individual and one in a relay), both of which he earned during the opening weekend of the 2009-10 Cross-Country Skiing World Cup in Beitostølen, Norway. On November 21, 2009, Hafsås, who had been better established at the professional level as a biathlete, surprisingly won the 15 km freestyle individual competition that opened the year, by the very narrow margin of 0.2 seconds ahead of Vincent Vittoz. This earned him a spot in the Norwegian team for the next day's 4 × 10 km relay. Hafsås' performance on the third leg wasn't as stellar as the day before, as he gave up some ground to Alexander Legkov of Russia and René Sommerfeldt of Germany; however, Norway still won thanks to Petter Northug as the anchor.

At the 2010 Winter Olympics, he finished 42nd in the 15 km event.

Hafsås retired after the 2012–13 season after having been hampered by illness for three seasons.

Cross-country skiing results
All results are sourced from the International Ski Federation (FIS).

Olympic Games

World Cup

Season standings

Individual podiums
 1 victory – (1 ) 
 1 podium – (1 )

Team podiums
 1 victory – (1 ) 
 1 podium – (1 )

References

External links

IBU profile

1985 births
Cross-country skiers at the 2010 Winter Olympics
Living people
Norwegian male biathletes
Norwegian male cross-country skiers
Olympic cross-country skiers of Norway
People from Sogn og Fjordane
Sportspeople from Vestland